Kinky is the fifth studio album by Australian rock group Hoodoo Gurus. It was released on 9 April 1991 by RCA Records and peaked at number 4 on the Australian charts and number 172 on the American Billboard charts.

EMI re-released the album on 7 February 2005 with four additional tracks, a fold out poster and liner notes by Dave Gray (Rocket Science).

Track listing

Personnel
Album is credited to:
Hoodoo Gurus members
 Dave Faulkner- Guitar, vocals, keyboards
 Mark Kingsmill  - Drums, metal percussion, metal objects
 Brad Shepherd - Guitar, vocals
 Richard Grossman - Bass, vocals (background)

Additional musicians
 Vicki Peterson - Backing vocals (track 6)
 Rob Younger - Vocals (track 9)
 Stephanie Faulkner - Backing vocals (track 2)
 Sunil DeSilva - Additional Percussion  (track 3)

Additional credits
 Engineer — Alan Thorne
 Assistant Engineers — David, Mackie, Robert Hodgson
 Mastering — Greg Calbi
 Mixers — Ed Stasium, Paul Hamingson
 Assistant Mixer — Kyle Bess
 Producer — Hoodoo Gurus

Charts

Weekly charts

Year end charts

Certifications

References 

Hoodoo Gurus albums
1991 albums